Sheko may refer to:

Sheko language, Omotic language spoken by the Sheko people
Sheko (woreda), Southern Nations, Nationalities and Peoples' Region, Ethiopia
Shek O, village in Southern District, Hong Kong